Myeik may refer to:

 Myeik District, a district of the Taninthayi Division of Burma (Myanmar)
 Myeik Township, a township in the district above
 Myeik, Myanmar or Mergui, a city in the township above
 Myeik Airport, an airport serving the city above
 Mergui Archipelago, also known as the Myeik Archipelago, off the coast of the areas above